The True Story of Frank Zappa's 200 Motels is a documentary film released in 1988 by Frank Zappa, detailing the making of Zappa's 1971 film 200 Motels. It was released direct-to-video.

Cast
Appearing as themselves:

Theodore Bikel
Jimmy Carl Black 
George Duke	
Aynsley Dunbar	
Janet Ferguson		
Howard Kaylan	
Martin Lickert	
Lucy Offerall	
Don Preston
Euclid James 'Motorhead' Sherwood
Ringo Starr		
Ian Underwood	
Mark Volman	
Sarina-Marie Volman	
Frank Zappa

References

External links

1988 films
1988 direct-to-video films
1988 documentary films
American documentary films
Direct-to-video documentary films
Documentary films about films
Films directed by Frank Zappa
Films scored by Frank Zappa
Films set in 1971
1980s English-language films
1980s American films